Ben Ib is a computer graphics artist living and working in London. He has directed music videos for Kylie Minogue, Calvin Harris, The Ting Tings, Roni Size, Goldie Lookin Chain, Mr Hudson and Stateless. He has also created live tour visuals for Paul McCartney, Roger Waters, Robbie Williams, Minogue and The Smashing Pumpkins, as well as creating the cover image for AC/DC's Power Up album (Creative Direction by Josh Cheuse) and Paul McCartney's New album (from a logo and cover concept conceived by UK art and design team Rebecca and Mike).

Early work
Ib studied art at Leeds University. His first digital short Collapse, created as a third-year university film won the "Video Positive" award in 1996 and was screened on Channel Four's "Digital Underground" series. His early student work was screened at the Hanover Film Festival, the AVE Festival (Arnhem, The Netherlands), One Dot Zero, Cinefeel and the Edinburgh Film Festival. In 1998 Ib relocated to London to work as a 3D artist in the post-production industry, eventually moving into the direction of television advertisements and music videos.

Music videos
 Calvin Harris – "Ready for the Weekend"
 The Ting Tings – "We Walk"
 Kylie Minogue – "The One" 
 Mr Hudson – "Too Late Too Late"
 Jentina – "Mysterious"
 Goldie Lookin Chain – "Your Missus Is a Nutter"
 Roni Size ft Beverly Knight – "No More"
 Ali Love – "Secret Sunday Lover"
 Switches –  "Lay Down the Law"
 Stateless – "Down Here"
 AC/DC – "Demon Fire"

Concert visuals
 Tame Impala – Slow Rush Tour
 Kylie Minogue – Glastonbury Festival Legends Slot
 The Killers – Wonderful Wonderful Tour
 Paul McCartney – One on One Tour
 The Who – Glastonbury Festival
 The Killers – Glastonbury Festival
 Paul McCartney – Out There! Tour
 Paul McCartney – On the Run Tour
 Paul McCartney – The Liverpool Sound Concert
 Roger Waters – The Wall Live
 Kylie Minogue – Aphrodite Tour
 Kylie Minogue – X Tour
 Robbie Williams – Close Encounters Tour

Other work
 AC/DC – Power Up album cover image (Creative Direction Josh Cheuse)
 The Neon Demon - Film title sequence (With All City Media)
 Paul McCartney – New album cover image (Logo and cover concept by Rebecca and Mike, Consultancy and design by YES) 
 Paul McCartney –  "Ramming" documentary, 2012 (Director)
 Razorlight –  "Golden Touch – Live at the Bicklayers Arms" (Director)
 SJWatson – "Before I go to Sleep" commercial (Director)
 Directed television advertisements for Coke Light, Sunsilk and Dulux

References

External links
 Director Website
 "Ramming" Documentary
 Interview: The making of "Ready For the Weekend"
 Interview - Behind the scenes on Kylie's 'The One'
 Interview: Kylie's The One by Ben Ib*
 Interview: The making of "The Wall"

Place of birth missing (living people)
Year of birth missing (living people)
Alumni of the University of Leeds
Computer animation people
Living people
British music video directors
Musicians from London